The Education Specialist, also referred to as Educational Specialist or Specialist in Education (Ed.S. or S.Ed.), is a specialist degree in education which is an advanced professional degree in the U.S. that is designed to provide knowledge and theory in the field of education beyond the master's degree level. Generally, 30-65 hours of graduate study are required, depending on the specialty. Specializations are available in computing technology, educational leadership, training and development, school psychology, counselor education, special education, curriculum and instruction, and adult education.

These are highly specialized degrees meant for professionals who require advanced proficiency in a field such as adult education, instructional technology, curriculum and instruction, educational psychology, educational leadership or special education, but who do not have the time or desire to complete a dissertation.

See also
 College of Education
 Doctor of Education
 Educational leadership
 Adult education
 Training 
 Training & Development

References

Academic degrees of the United States